Abée Castle is a fortified château in the municipality of Tinlot, Liège Province, Wallonia, Belgium. The present building dates from the 18th century, but incorporates parts of a medieval structure.

See also
List of castles in Belgium
List of protected heritage sites in Tinlot

External links
 
Abée Castle from www.castles.nl

Castles in Belgium
Castles in Liège Province